UFC Fight Night: Gustafsson vs. Teixeira (also known as UFC Fight Night 109) was a mixed martial arts event produced by the Ultimate Fighting Championship held on May 28, 2017, at Ericsson Globe in Stockholm, Sweden.

Background
Preliminary reports indicated that the event was expected to be contested at the newly opened Royal Arena in Copenhagen, which would have marked the promotion's first visit to Denmark. However, on February 28, the promotion announced that the event would take place in Stockholm.

A light heavyweight bout between former UFC Light Heavyweight Championship challengers Alexander Gustafsson and Glover Teixeira served as the main event. The pairing was previously scheduled to headline UFC Fight Night 69 in June 2015. However, Gustafsson pulled out of that fight due to injury.

Magnus Cedenblad was expected to face Chris Camozzi at the event. However, Cedenblad was removed from the card on March 27 and was replaced by Trevor Smith.

Emil Weber Meek was expected to face Nordine Taleb at the event. However, Meek pulled out of the fight on May 12 citing injury. He was replaced by promotional newcomer Oliver Enkamp.

A heavyweight bout between Christian Colombo and Damian Grabowski was expected to take place at the event. However, the pairing was scrapped as both fighters sustained injuries in the weeks leading up to the event.

Mairbek Taisumov was expected to face Joaquim Silva at the event. However, Taisumov pulled out of the fight on May 16 citing a knee injury. He was replaced by Reza Madadi.

At the weigh-ins, Darren Till came in at 176 lb, five pounds over the welterweight limit of 171 lb. As a result, he was fined 20% of his purse, which went to his opponent Jessin Ayari and the bout proceeded at a catchweight.

Results

During the post-fight interview Alexander Gustafsson proposed to his girlfriend.

Bonus awards
The following fighters were awarded $50,000 bonuses:
Fight of the Night: Alexander Gustafsson vs. Glover Teixeira
Performance of the Night: Bojan Veličković and Damir Hadžović

See also

List of UFC events
2017 in UFC

References

UFC Fight Night
Mixed martial arts in Sweden
Sport in Stockholm
2017 in mixed martial arts
2017 in Swedish sport
May 2017 sports events in Europe